The Maritime history of Europe represents the era of recorded human interaction with the sea in the northwestern region of Eurasia in areas that include shipping and shipbuilding, shipwrecks, naval battles, and military installations and lighthouses constructed to protect or aid navigation and the development of Europe. 
Europe is situated between several navigable seas and intersected by navigable rivers running into them in a way which greatly facilitated the influence of maritime traffic and commerce. Great battles have been fought in the seas off of Europe that changed the course of history forever, including the Battle of Salamis in the Mediterranean, the Battle of Gravelines at the eastern end of the English Channel in the summer of 1588, in which the “Invincible”   Spanish Armada was defeated, the Battle of Jutland in World War I, and World War II’s U-boat war.

Ancient times

Egyptian sources mention regular shipments of copper from the island of Cyprus, that arrived at the city of Byblos as early as 2,600 years BCE. The Minoans of Crete are the earliest known European seafarers of the Mediterranean Sea. Little is known of their ships, but they reportedly traded pottery as far west as Sicily. According to the historian Thucydides, by 1,900 years BCE. their King Minos commanded a navy and conquered the islands of the Aegean. The Mycenaeans would obtain maritime hegemony in the region around 1,600 BCE and hold it until the attacks of the Sea Peoples, that disrupted the maritime culture and the naval balance of power in the Eastern Mediterranean during the Late Bronze Age collapse between 1,200 and 900 years BCE.

During the following centuries the ancient Greek navies first began to use ships with two banks of oars and by the 6th century BCE. the three banked trireme had been adopted by all sea-faring Poleis. Alongside the Phoenicians, who since around 1,200 BCE. had settled in the Levant and Northern Africa, Greek trading fleets and navies dominated the Mediterranean until the ascent of Rome in the third and second century BCE.

Greek ships, methods of engagement, movement and command under the Athenian Strategos Themistocles proved to be highly effective during the Greco-Persian Wars (499 to 449 BCE). Relatively small Greek forces successfully delayed the Persian fleet in a series of naval engagements in 480 BCE. Naval conflict culminated in the straits between the port of Piraeus and Salamis Island during the Battle of Salamis (September 480 BCE), when 371 Greek triremes and pentekonters defeated King Xerxes' Persian fleet of over 1,200 ships, that included Phoenician, Egyptian, Cilician and Cypriot contingents. The city of Athens, that had risen to naval supremacy among the Greek poleis was defeated in the Peloponnesian War and lost its fleet against the Peloponnesian League under Lysander in the Battle of Aegospotami in 405 BCE.

Around 325 B.C. Pytheas, a Greek geographer and explorer undertook a voyage of exploration to northwestern Europe (modern-day Great Britain and Ireland) and beyond. In his account On The Ocean (Τὰ περὶ τοῦ Ὠκεανοῦ), that is only known through the writings of Strabo and Pliny the Elder, he introduces the idea of the land of Thule and describes Celtic and Germanic tribes, the Arctic, polar ice and the midnight sun.

Maritime history of Republican and Imperial Rome

During the First Punic War, the admiralty of the Roman Republic conceived new and progressive ways of fleet construction, development and composition in order to successfully engage the Carthaginian navy. Victories at the Battle of Mylae, the Battle of Cape Ecnomus, the Battle of Cape Hermaeum and the Battle of the Aegates encouraged the Romans to pursue naval-based warfare and strategies in order to push the center of combat to the Carthaginian heartland in North Africa.

By the end of the Macedonian Wars in the latter half of the 2nd century BC, Roman control over the Aegean sea was undisputed and full hegemony over the entire Mediterranean Sea, now referred to as Mare Nostrum ("our sea") had been established.

Roman galleys helped to build the Roman Empire. The empires’ struggle with Carthage inspired them to build and to fight in war galleys, but the galleys did not have much cargo space, so “round ships” were constructed for trade, especially with Egypt. Many of these ships reached  in length and were capable of carrying over a thousand tons of cargo. These ships used sail power alone to haul commodities in the mediterranean. The volume of trade that the Roman merchant fleet carried was larger than any other until the industrial revolution. We know quite a bit about these round ships, since Romans, like Egyptians and Greeks, left records in stone, sometimes even on a sarcophagus.

There were many shipwrecks of Roman vessels, which can be explained by the very large number of trading vessels during Roman times since the volume of sea trade in the mediterranean reached a quantity to be only equaled in the 19th century. This greatly increased the number of shipwrecks.

Byzantine Empire

The western Mediterranean came under the control of the barbarians, after their invasion split the Empire in two, while Byzantium dominated the eastern half of the sea. The eastern empire lasted until 1453, such was the efficiency of the Byzantine navy, with its fleets armed with Byzantine fire (or Greek fire), a mixture of naphtha oil and saltpetre, fired through tubes in the bows of the ship.  Enemy ships were often afraid to get too close to the Byzantine fleet, since the liquid fire gave the Byzantines a considerable advantage.

The Viking Age

Also called the Vikings, the Norsemen raided towns and villages along the coasts of the British Isles, Scandinavia, as far south as Cádiz, Spain and even attacked Pisa, Italy in 860. They sailed up the Seine River in France, settled Normandy (which derives its name from the Norsemen), and settled Dublin after invading Ireland. Varangians were more concerned with trading than raiding, and sailed along Russian rivers and opened commercial routes to the Caspian Sea as well as the Black Sea.

The Vikings were the best naval architects of their day, and the Viking longship was both large and versatile. The shallow draft enabled them to navigate far inland in shallow rivers.

"From the fury of the Norsemen, good Lord, deliver us," has entered apocryphal knowledge as a common prayer among the people of western Europe during the period of the Norse raiders from the late 8th century to the 11th century. According to the website Viking Answer Lady,
which in turn cites Magnus Magnusson's Vikings! as its reference, 
No 9th century text has ever been discovered containing these words, although numerous medieval litanies and prayers contain general formulas for deliverance against unnamed enemies. The closest documentable phrase is a single sentence, taken from an antiphony for churches dedicated to St. Vaast or St. Medard: Summa pia gratia nostra conservando corpora et custodita, de gente fera Normannica nos libera, quae nostra vastat, Deus, regna, ”Oh highest, pious grace, free us, oh God, by preserving our bodies and those in our keeping from the cruel Norse people who ravage our realms.”.

The Hanseatic League

 
The Hanseatic League was a commercial and defensive alliance of the merchant guilds of towns and cities in northern and central Europe that established and maintained a trade monopoly over the Baltic Sea and most of Northern Europe between the 13th and 17th centuries. 
Although trading alliances in the region were forming as early as 1157, the town of Lübeck did not form an alliance with Hamburg (which controlled access to salt routes from Lüneburg), until 1241.

Trade was carried on chiefly by sea in order to escape tolls and political barriers, and at the end of the 15th century the Hanseatic League controlled some 60,000 tons of shipping. Although compasses were commonly being used in the Mediterranean during this period, the captains of Hanseatic vessels seemed slow to adopt the new technology, which put them in greater danger of wrecking. They also had to deal with pirates. During its zenith the alliance maintained trading posts and kontors in virtually all cities between London and Edinburgh in the west to Novgorod in the east and Bergen in Norway.

The League's power declined after 1450 due to a number of factors, such as the 15th-century crisis, the territorial lords' shifting policies towards greater commercial control, the silver crisis and when the great herring shoals disappeared in the Baltic. During the late 16th century and early 17th century, the League fell apart, as it was unable to deal with its own internal struggles, the rise of Swedish, Dutch and English merchants, and the social and political changes that accompanied the Reformation.
Although a tight-fisted monopoly, the League's need for more cargo space led to new designs in shipbuilding, and its free association of about 160 towns and villages was a historically unique economic alliance that showed the benefits of well-regulated commerce.

Republic of Venice
 

Around 1300, Venice began to develop the great galley of commerce, the ‘’galea grossa’’. It grew to carry a crew of more than 200 and weighed as much as 250 tons. These galleys took passengers and goods to Constantinople (now Istanbul), and to Alexandria in Egypt, and returned to Venice carrying luxury items. A sea route to the Indies discovered by Portugal signaled an end to the glory days of Venice's merchant galleys and spice trade, but the war galleys (or fighting galleys) lived on. The war galleys were mostly manned by prisoners of war or convicts, who were chained to benches, usually three to six per oar.

More than 3,000 Venetian merchant ships were in operation by the year 1450. The trading empire of the Republic of Venice lasted longer than any other in history, and even merchants vessels were required to carry weapons and passengers were expected to be armed and ready to fight. From the beginning of the 13th century until the end of the 18th century, the Republic ruled the Adriatic, the Aegean and the Black Seas. The Republic of Genoa was Venice's main rival, and many wars were fought between them. In 1298 the Genoese destroyed the Venetian fleet at Curzola, but were themselves defeated in 1354 at Sapienza in Greece.

The European Age of Discovery (1400–1600)

The Age of Discovery started with the Portuguese navigators, where Prince Henry the Navigator started a maritime school in Portugal, eventually leading to new shipbuilding technologies including the caravel, the carrack and the galleon. The Portuguese Empire led the Portuguese Kingdom to discover and map more of the globe, such as the remarkable voyage to find the sea route to India via the Cape of Good Hope. Initially Bartolomeu Dias left Portugal and rounded the Cape of Good Hope, with Vasco da Gama reaching the southern tip of Africa and on-wards to India. It was the first time in history that humans had navigated from Europe around Africa to Asia, though the Fra Mauro map suggests that ships from India had crossed the Cape of Good Hope in 1420. It led to the discovery of Brazil and South America, and the first circumnavigation around the world, with the Portuguese nobleman Ferdinand Magellan, sailing around the world, across the entire Pacific Ocean for the first time.

At the beginning of the 16th century, sea clashes in the Indian Ocean as the decisive Battle of Diu, in 1509, marked a turning point in history: the shift from the Mediterranean and from the relatively isolated seas, disputed in antiquity and in the Middle Ages, to the oceans and to the European hegemony on a global scale.

Christopher Columbus set sail in Santa Maria on what is probably history's most well known voyage of discovery on August 3, 1492. Leaving from the town of Palos, in southern Spain, Columbus headed west. After a brief stop in the Canary Islands for provisions and repairs, he set out for Asia. He reached San Salvador first, it is believed, (easternmost of the Bahamas) in October, and then sailed past Cuba and Hispaniola, still searching for Asia. He returned home in 1493 to a hero's welcome, and within six months had 1,500 men and 17 vessels at his command.

The year 1571 saw the last great battle between galleys, when more than 400 Turkish and Christian vessels engaged each other on the Gulf of Patras. The Battle of Lepanto as it was called, saw some 38,000 men perish. Miguel de Cervantes, author of Don Quixote, was wounded during the battle.
In April 1587, Sir Francis Drake burned 37 Spanish ships in the harbor at Cádiz, in southern Spain.

The publication of Jan Huygen van Linschoten's book Voyages provided a significant turning point in Europe's maritime history. Before the publication of this book, knowledge of the sea route to the Far East had been well guarded by the Portuguese for over a century. Voyages was published in several languages, including English and German (published in 1598), Latin (1599), and French (1610). Widely read by Europeans, the original Dutch edition and the French translation had second editions published.

Once knowledge of the sea route became available to all Europeans, more ships headed to East Asia. A Dutch fleet embarked on a voyage to India using Linschoten's charts in 1595. (The Dutch version of his book was published in 1596, but his sea charts had been published the previous year).  The publication of the nautical maps enabled the Dutch and British East India companies to break the trade monopoly Portugal held with the East Indies. Protestant Europe was ushered into the age of discovery in large part thanks to his work.

European innovations

From the sixth to the eighteenth centuries, the maritime history of Europe had a profound impact on the rest of the world.  The broadside-cannoned full-rigged sixteenth-century sailing ship provided the continent with a weapon to dominate the world.

During this time period, Europeans made remarkable inroads in maritime innovations. These innovations enabled them to expand overseas and set up colonies, most notably during the sixteenth and seventeenth centuries.   They developed new sail arrangements for ships, skeleton-based shipbuilding, the Western “galea” (at the end of the 11th century), sophisticated navigational instruments, and detailed charts. After Isaac Newton published the Principia, navigation was transformed. Starting in 1670, the entire world was measured using essentially modern latitude instruments and the best available clocks. In 1730 the sextant was invented and navigators rapidly replaced their astrolabes.

Barbary pirates
For several centuries, from about the time of the Crusades until the early 19th century, the Barbary pirates of northern Africa preyed on ships in the western Mediterranean Sea. In 1816, the Royal Navy, with assistance from the Dutch, destroyed the Barbary fleet in the port of Algiers. The best-known pirate of this period may have been Barbarossa, the nickname of Khair ad Din, an Ottoman-Turkish admiral and privateer who was born on the island of Lesbos, (present-day Greece), and lived from about 1475–1546.

Siege of Gibraltar and the Battle of Trafalgar

July 1779 saw the start of the Great Siege of Gibraltar, an attempt by France and Spain to wrest control of Gibraltar from the British. The garrison survived all attacks, including an assault on September 13, 1782, that included 48 ships and 450 cannon. In October 1805, the Battle of Trafalgar took place, which involved 60 vessels, 27 British, and 33 French and Spanish. The British did not lose a single ship, and destroyed the enemy fleet, but Admiral Lord Nelson died in the battle. It was the most significant naval battle of the beginning of the 19th century, and confirmed the British Navy's supremacy of the time.

Lighthouses

The Pharos of Meloria is often considered the first lighthouse in Europe since Roman times. Meloria, a rocky islet off the Tuscan coast in the Tyrrhenian Sea, was the location of two medieval naval battles.  The Tower of Hercules (Torre de Hércules), in northwestern Spain, is almost 1,900 years old. The ancient Roman lighthouse stands near A Coruña, Galicia, and is 57 metres (185 ft) in height. It is the oldest working Roman lighthouse in the world.

According to Smithsonian, a lighthouse on the Gironde River in France, Cardovan Tower, was the first lighthouse to use a Fresnel lens in 1822.

Oil spills
There have been several large oil spills off the coasts of Europe since 1967. They include:

Aegean Sea — A Coruña, Spain, December 3, 1992
Amoco Cadiz — Brittany, France, March 16, 1978
 — Shetland Islands, January 5, 1993
Othello — Trälhavet Bay, Sweden, March 20, 1970
Prestige — Galicia, Spain, November 13, 2002
 — Cornwall, England, March 18, 1967

See also

History of Europe
Maritime history
Naval warfare
Timeline of maritime migration and exploration

References

Further reading
 A Study of 16th Century Western Books on Korea: The Birth of an Image, Myongji University
Pryor, John, Maritime History, University of Sydney, course outline
Villiers, Alan, Men Ships and the Sea, National Geographic Society, 1962, pgs. 62, 70, 132 & 133

External links
National Maritime Museum, London - 
Early Maritime Maps Online

History of Europe
Europe